Lohaganjar is a village located in Siwan, Bihar, India. It is 17 km far away from Siwan junction. Ziradei, Karchhui and Mairwa are the nearest railway stations. The distance between Ziradei station and Lohaganjar is 5 km.

References 

Villages in Siwan district